John Richard Schneider (born April 8, 1960) is an American actor and country music singer. He is best known for his portrayal of  Beauregard "Bo" Duke in the American television action/comedy series The Dukes of Hazzard (opposite Tom Wopat, Catherine Bach and James Best), Jonathan Kent in the 2001–11 TV series Smallville, and James "Jim" Cryer on the television series The Haves and the Have Nots, created by Tyler Perry.

Alongside his acting career, Schneider has been a singer since the early 1980s, releasing nine studio albums and a greatest hits package, as well as eighteen singles. This total includes "I've Been Around Enough to Know", "Country Girls", "What's a Memory Like You", and "You're the Last Thing I Needed Tonight", all of which reached the top of the Billboard country singles charts.

Early life
Schneider was born on April 8, 1960, in Mount Kisco, New York, the youngest of three boys for Shirley Conklin (1932-2016) and John "Jack" Schneider III (1930-2013), a pilot who had served in the U.S. Air Force. His mother is from Sanford, Florida. His family included an older brother Robert, an artist living in southern New York. His other brother (also called John) died of lung failure age 3, three years before John's birth. John's life as an entertainer began at the age of eight, when he put on magic shows for his peers and their families. This once got him into trouble, when he had himself chained up and tossed into a swimming pool with the intention of re-creating Harry Houdini's legendary escape act. When he was 14, he and his mother moved to Atlanta, Georgia, where his love for performing continued. He went to North Springs High School in Sandy Springs, Georgia.

Career

Acting career

At the age of 18, he won the role of Bo Duke, working alongside another newcomer Tom Wopat and veteran actor James Best. For his audition, he "borrowed a dilapidated pickup truck, put on a big ol' country accent and funky hat. I hadn't shaved and went in toting a beer. I don't know whether they believed it or not, but they liked it." Schneider learned to drive the iconic Dodge Charger in the show, but to the disappointment of many fans, he admitted he never jumped the car due to the dangerous nature of the stunt.

At the height of the series' popularity, he also became a recording artist and a face of merchandise. In 1982, a tangle of legal suits with the producers over the distribution of merchandising royalties caused Schneider and co-star Tom Wopat to leave the show for most of a season. They returned to their roles in February 1983 only after their claims were satisfied. The show was canceled in 1985, after seven seasons. Schneider directed the series finale, titled Opening Night at the Boar's Nest, airing originally on CBS, February 8, 1985.

In 2001, he portrayed Jonathan Kent, the adoptive father of Clark Kent on Smallville, starring in 100 episodes. Schneider directed some episodes of Smallville, including "Talisman". Some episodes contain references to Schneider's work in The Dukes of Hazzard, e.g. the season five episode "Exposed" is notable for reuniting Schneider with his former Dukes co-star Tom Wopat. Schneider guest starred for the latter half of season five appearing in the episodes "Void" and "Oracle". Schneider returned for the season 10 premiere of Smallville, reprising his role as Jonathan Kent in a recurring role.

Schneider has appeared in many films and TV series, including five guest spots on Hee Haw and the miniseries 10.5. He had a recurring role on Dr. Quinn, Medicine Woman and made guest appearances on such shows as Diagnosis: Murder, Touched by an Angel, JAG and Walker, Texas Ranger.

In 2009, Schneider made an appearance on CSI in an episode titled "Kill Me If You Can". He appeared in the first season of The Secret Life of the American Teenager, in which his real-life son Chasen Schneider had a recurring role. During the summer of 2008 and early 2009, John portrayed "Marshall Bowman". He declined to continue through the second season and his character was written off.

In 2010, Schneider appeared in the series Leverage as a corrupt music executive in the season three episode "The Studio Job", and in several episodes of Desperate Housewives as a retired military man and father of Keith Watson (Brian Austin Green), the love interest of Bree Van de Kamp.

In 2011, he starred in the film Doonby, as a drifter who comes into a small town and makes it better. However, a menacing force stalks him. "It's It's a Wonderful Life without the wonderful part," Schneider explains. "'Reach down into the throat of It's a Wonderful Life, pull it inside out and make a movie out of it."

He returned to the role of Bo Duke, alongside Tom Wopat as Luke Duke, in a 2014 commercial for Autotrader.com.

Filmmaking career

In addition to acting, John Schneider owns and operates the John Schneider Studios (JSS) where he writes and produces independent films in Holden, Louisiana. John Schneider Studios (JSS) has created an infrastructure to give independent filmmakers all the tools they need to create their stories and films in one location.

Music career

During Schneider's Dukes of Hazzard days, he also entered into music. In the early 80's Schneider signed with Scotti Brothers Label and released his debut full-length album, Now or Never, which peaked at No. 8 on the US Country Billboard charts. The single "It's Now or Never," a remake of the Elvis Presley hit, peaked at number 4 on the US Country Billboard charts and peaked at number 14 on the Billboard Hot 100 chart in 1981 and is one of the highest charting Elvis covers of all time.  Schneider continued to release albums, including Quiet Man and If You Believe, and, in 1984, signed with MCA Nashville. Through MCA Nashville, Schneider released Too Good to Stop Now which included his first No. 1 hits, "I've Been Around Enough to Know" and "Country Girls," also peaking at No. 1 on the CAN Country music charts. The following year, Schneider unleashed Tryin' To Outrun the Wind, followed by A Memory Like You which debuted at No. 1 on the US Country Billboard charts, a first for Schneider. The album A Memory Like You featured "What's a Memory Like You (Doing In A Love Like This)" and "You're The Last Thing I Needed Tonight," singles which both peaked at No. 1 on the US Country Billboard charts and CAN Country. In the late 80's, Schneider continued releasing albums including his Greatest Hits record. Taking some time off to pursue acting opportunities, Schneider returned with Worth The Wait, John's Acoustic Christmas, The Promise and Home For Christmas, with The Dukes of Hazzard co-star Tom Wopat in 2014.
In 2019, on January 29, LIVE, at a filming of the TV show "Good Rockin' Tonight," John Schneider was Inducted on the air into The Louisiana Music Hall Of Fame in Baton Rouge, Louisiana.
"I hadn't done music since 1990. People responded to that music, and one thing led to another," shares Schneider. "It's funny. Even though I had a bunch of No. 1 songs, people say, 'Oh, I love that Dukes of Hazzard song you sang!' Well, I didn't sing it, Waylon Jennings sang it. I'm famous for music by a song I never sang. Crazy."
More than a dozen artists are joining Schneider in recording songs for Odyssey, including Tanya Tucker, John Conlee, Steve Wariner, Collin Raye, Mark Wills, Jamie O'Neal, Heidi Newfield, Bobby Bare, Kelly Lang, Jim Brown, Danny Shirley, Doug Supernaw and Marty Raybon, among others. More information about Odyssey can be found by visiting Schneider's website.

In November 2021, Schneider spoke and performed at Global Vision Bible Church in Wilson County, Tennessee.

Theater career
Schneider has also been involved with a number of stage performances:
42nd Street [Pittsburgh, PA (Regional)]
Pittsburgh CLO Revival, 2006
Julian Marsh [Replacement]
Chicago [Broadway]
Broadway Revival, 1996
Billy Flynn [Replacement]
Grand Hotel [Broadway]
Original Broadway Production, 1989
Felix Von Gaigern [Replacement]
(source: Broadway World)

Audio book career
Schneider took part In the "Word Of Promise" Audio Bible series, which featured the voices of many famous actors and actresses. He voiced James in the Book of James.

Dancing with the Stars
On September 12, 2018, Schneider was announced as one of the celebrities who would compete on season 27 of Dancing with the Stars. His professional partner was Emma Slater. They became the sixth couple to be eliminated from the competition on November 5, alongside DeMarcus Ware and his professional partner Lindsay Arnold.

Personal life
In 1982, Schneider co-founded the Children's Miracle Network with Marie Osmond and her brothers. In 1995, he founded FaithWorks Productions in order to produce family-oriented videos and recordings.
In 1998, Schneider became a born-again Christian while living with Johnny and June Carter Cash for a short time, and speaking with Johnny about Christianity.

Schneider was married to former Miss America Tawny Elaine Godin from 1983 to 1986. He married his second wife, Elly Castle, on July 11, 1993. On December 12, 2014, TMZ.com reported that Castle had filed for divorce, They have three children: two are Castle's children from her first marriage (born in 1991) and a daughter together. Schneider was in a relationship with Alicia Allain, his producing partner and owner of Maven Entertainment, from April 2015 until Allain's death on February 22, 2023. Alicia was also his personal and professional manager. They married in September 2019.

Schneider was good friends with James Best, who played Sheriff Rosco P. Coltrane in The Dukes of Hazzard, until his death on April 6, 2015, at age 88.

On June 12, 2018, Schneider spoke to Fox News regarding his upcoming three-day jail sentence for failing to pay alimony to his estranged wife Elvira Castle. He said he has had hard financial times and he has spent his money on repairing his studio in Louisiana which was destroyed in an August 2016 flood. He was arrested at 10:29 AM and released at 3:45 PM. The short imprisonment was due to the overcrowded prison. He contrasted the warm treatment of the corrections officers to the "guilty until proven innocent" treatment he received in the court system. However, he still has to do 240 hours of community service and pay the debt to Elvira, or else he faces an imprisonment of five years.

Filmography

Television

Film

Discography

Albums

Singles

Promotional singles

Music videos

References

External links

 
 
 
 

1960 births
American evangelicals
American country singer-songwriters
American film producers
American male film actors
American male musical theatre actors
American male screenwriters
American male singer-songwriters
American male television actors
American male voice actors
American people of German descent
Living people
Male actors from New York (state)
MCA Records artists
People from Mount Kisco, New York
Converts to Christianity
Screenwriters from New York (state)
20th-century American singers
20th-century American male singers
21st-century American singers
21st-century American male singers
21st-century American screenwriters
21st-century American male writers